The Minolta Dimage 7, 7i, 7Hi series is a "pro-sumer" line of digital electronic viewfinder cameras from Minolta. These are also known as bridge digital cameras. They are capable of capturing images in the 5-megapixel range.

The Dimage 7 was announced 11 February 2001. The line uses a 2588 × 1960 pixel sensor coupled with a permanently attached optical 28–200 mm (35 mm equivalent) f/2.8W – f/3.5T zoom lens with a macro switch (16 elements in 13 groups, includes two AD glass elements and two aspheric elements)

The Dimage 7/7i/7Hi series cameras were powered with four AA batteries, which discharged quickly; the 7-series was replaced by the DiMAGE A1 in July 2003.

Specifications

References

External links 

 Complete review of Dimage 7
 Comparison of 7Hi and 7i
 RAW Deal
 UFRaw
 Bryan D. K. Biggers Digital Camera Experiments
 Minolta Dimage 7 Bugs and Tips
 Jens Roesner − Camera Page
 Pete Ganzel − Camera Page